Actia ampla is a species of parasitic fly in the family Tachinidae. It is found in temperate Asia.

References

Further reading

 
 

ampla
Articles created by Qbugbot
Insects described in 1998